Gran Station is located on the Gjøvik Line at Gran in Norway. The station was opened on 20 December 1900. It is served by the Oslo Commuter Rail, operated by Vy Gjøvikbanen, twice each two hours.

External links 
 Entry at Jernbaneverket <
 Entry at the Norwegian Railway Club 

Railway stations in Oppland
Railway stations on the Gjøvik Line
Railway stations opened in 1900
1900 establishments in Norway
Gran, Norway